Suleiman Selembe (born 18 October 1987) is a Tanzanian football midfielder who plays for Malindi.

References

1987 births
Living people
Tanzanian footballers
Tanzania international footballers
Azam F.C. players
African Lyon F.C. players
Coastal Union F.C. players
Polisi FC players
Maji Maji F.C. players
Association football midfielders
Zanzibar international footballers
Tanzanian expatriate footballers
Expatriate footballers in the Democratic Republic of the Congo
Tanzanian expatriate sportspeople in the Democratic Republic of the Congo
Tanzanian Premier League players